Rozka or Ruzka Korczak (1921, Płock – 1988) was a Polish partisan leader during World War II. A Polish Jew, she served in the United Partisan Organization (Fareynikte Partizaner Organizatsye) and, alongside Vitka Kempner and founder Abba Kovner, assumed a leadership role in its successor group, the Avengers (Nokmim)--the only known undefeated ghetto uprising in the history of the Holocaust.

Early life
Korczak was born in April 1921 in Bieslko, to a cattle dealer. Her family moved to a small village in Płock where she attended public school. In eighth grade, she organized a Jewish student strike to protest Anti-Semitism in the school. As a teenager, she joined a Zionist organization called HaShomer HaTzair (the young guard).

During World War Two
During the invasion of Poland by Germany in 1939, Korczak  fled to Lituania and met Vitka Kempner in Vilna thanks to HaShomer HaTzair. Upon Germany's invasion of the Soviet Union, she co-founded the United Partisan Organization (FPO) with Abba Kovner  and Kempner in 1942. They smuggled weapons into the Vilna Ghetto and smuggled Jews out.

As the situation worsened in the ghetto, she left it in September 1943 with the last group of fighters passing through the sewers and took refuge in the forests of Rudninkai and Naroch. After the liberation of Vilnius by the Red Army in July 1944, she and her companions focused on helping Jewish refugees and emigration to Palestine. She arrived there on December 12, 1944.

References 

1921 births
1988 deaths
People from Płock
Polish emigrants to Mandatory Palestine
Israeli people of Polish-Jewish descent
Hashomer Hatzair members
Jewish partisans
Jewish resistance members during the Holocaust
Vilna Ghetto inmates
Female resistance members of World War II
Deaths from cancer in Israel
Zionists